The 2008 Washington Democratic presidential caucuses were a series of events held by the Washington State Democratic Party to determine the delegates that the Party sent to the 2008 Democratic National Convention. Delegates were selected in a four-tier process that began with precinct caucuses, was further refined in legislative district caucuses and/or county conventions, concluded for some delegates in the congressional district caucuses, and finally concluded for the remaining delegates at the state convention.

Washington also held a Democratic primary on February 19, 2008, but the Washington State Democratic Party did not use the results of the primary to determine its delegates.

Delegate breakdown

The Washington State Democratic Party sent a total of 97 delegates to the 2008 Democratic National Convention. Of those delegates, 78 were pledged and 19 were unpledged. The 78 pledged delegates were allocated (pledged) to vote for a particular candidate at the National Convention according to the results of Washington's four-step caucus process. The 19 unpledged delegates were popularly called "superdelegates" because their vote represented their personal decisions, whereas the regular delegates' votes represented the collective decision of many voters. The superdelegates were free to vote for any candidate at the National Convention and were selected by the Washington State Democratic Party's officials and the pledged delegates.

The 78 pledged delegates were further divided into 51 district delegates and 27 statewide delegates. The 51 district delegates were divided among Washington's 9 Congressional Districts and were allocated to the presidential candidates based on the caucus results in each District. The 27 statewide delegates were divided into 17 at-large delegates and 10 Party Leaders and Elected Officials (abbreviated PLEOs). They were allocated to the presidential candidates at the State Convention based on the preference of the 51 district delegates on June 13–15.

Of the 19 unpledged delegates, 17 were selected in advance and 2 were selected at the State Convention.  The delegates selected in advance were 7 Democratic National Committee members, the 2 Democratic U.S. Senators from Washington, Maria Cantwell and Patty Murray, the 6 Democratic U.S. Representatives from Washington, and the Democratic Governor of Washington, Christine Gregoire.

Delegate selection process

Precinct caucuses

The precinct caucuses took place on February 9, 2008. Washington's two U.S. Senators, Patty Murray and Maria Cantwell, endorsed Senator Hillary Clinton earlier in the nomination season. The week before the caucuses, Senator Barack Obama was endorsed by Washington Governor Christine Gregoire.

The caucuses were open to all voters who would be 18 years old by November 4, 2008. To vote, participants completed a form with their contact information and candidate preference. The form also asked voters to sign an oath stating: "I declare that I consider myself to be a DEMOCRAT and I will not participate in the nomination process of any other political party for the 2008 Presidential election." In some caucus groups, members split into smaller groups according to the candidate they supported. Voters supporting non-viable candidates had the option of moving into viable groups, and voters in viable groups could change their preference. Unlike other state Democratic Party caucuses, Washington does not require a 15% threshold for allocation of delegates at the precinct level. Rules state that any fractional delegates remaining are awarded to the candidate with the most votes that do not have delegates.

Legislative District caucuses and County conventions

The second tier of the delegate selection process involved choosing 2,000 Legislative District delegates (and 1,000 alternates) to send to the Congressional District conventions on May 17 and the State Convention on June 13–15. There are 49 Legislative Districts in Washington State. Each district was allocated a certain number of delegates. Delegates were elected at either Legislative District caucuses or County conventions. Each of Washington's 39 counties has a local Democratic Party organization that determined the event at which delegate selection would take place. Most counties chose to select delegates at Legislative District caucuses on April 5. The remaining counties selected delegates at sub-caucuses during their County Conventions, most of which were held on either April 12 or April 19. The breakdown of events by date is listed below.

April 5

Legislative District caucuses:
1st through 6th
8th
11th
12th
16th (Benton County portion only, held at the 8th LD caucus)
21st
25th through 34th
36th through 39th
40th (San Juan County portion only)
41st through 48th

County Convention:
Whatcom (40th LD)

April 12

County Conventions:
Clallam (24th LD)
Franklin (9th & 16th LDs)
Grays Harbor (19th, 24th & 35th LDs)
Kitsap (23rd & 35th LDs)
Kittitas (13th LD)
Pend Oreille (7th LD)
Skagit (10th & 40th LDs)

April 13

County Convention:
Snohomish (10th LD)

April 19

County Conventions:
Asotin (9th LD)
Chelan (13th LD)
Clark (15th, 17th, 18th & 49th LDs)
Cowlitz (18th & 19th LDs)
Ferry (7th LD)
Grant (13th LD)
Island (10th LD)
Klickitat (15th LD)
Lewis (20th LD)
Lincoln (7th LD)
Mason (35th LD)
Okanogan (7th LD)
Pacific (19th LD)
Skamania (15th LD)
Spokane (7th & 9th LDs)
Stevens (7th LD)
Thurston (20th, 22nd & 35th LDs)
Wahkiakum (19th LD)
Whitman (9th LD)
Yakima (13th, 14th & 15th LDs)

April 20

County Convention:
Walla Walla (16th LD)

April 26

County Convention:
Jefferson (24th LD)

Unknown date

County Conventions:
Adams (9th LD)
Garfield (9th LD)
Columbia (16th LD)

Congressional district caucuses

Fifty-one delegates were chosen at the nine congressional district caucuses. Each district was allotted a different number of delegates:

 CD 1: 6
 CD 2: 6
 CD 3: 5
 CD 4: 3
 CD 5: 5
 CD 6: 6
 CD 7: 9
 CD 8: 6
 CD 9: 5

State convention

Twenty-nine delegates were chosen at the state convention, twenty-seven of which were pledged to vote for a particular candidate. Seventeen of these pledged delegates were "at-large" delegates that did not represent a specific Washington congressional district, and ten were party leaders and elected officials (PLEOs).

Polls

Results

Precinct caucuses

Caucus date: February 9, 2008

National pledged delegates determined: 0 (of 78)

Primary

The Washington State Democratic Party did not use the results of the primary to determine its delegates.

Primary date: February 19, 2008

National pledged delegates determined: 0 (of 78)

Legislative district caucuses and county conventions

Dashes indicate districts for which results are unavailable.

Caucus/Convention dates: April 5–26, 2008

National pledged delegates determined: 0 (of 78)

Congressional district caucuses

Caucus date: May 17, 2008

National pledged delegates determined: 51 (of 78)

State convention

Convention date: June 13–15, 2008

National pledged delegates determined: 27 (of 78)

See also
 2008 Democratic Party presidential primaries
 2008 Washington Republican presidential caucuses and primary

References

Washington
2008
2008 Washington (state) elections
February 2008 events in the United States